This is a list of characters from The Transformers television series.

Autobots
The Autobots (also known as Cybertrons in Japan) are the heroes in the Transformers toyline and related spin-off comics and cartoons. Their main leader is Optimus Prime, but other "Primes" have also commanded the Autobots such as Rodimus Prime. They are constantly at war with the Decepticons. In the U.S. cartoon line, the Autobots were the descendants of a line of robots created as consumer goods by the Quintessons; the Decepticons, are descended instead from robots designed as military hardware.

Other terms for the Autobots are Autorobots (in Italy), Autoboterna (in Sweden), Kibery (in Ukraine), and Robotrikim (in Israel).

Main characters

Autobot Cars

Mini-Bots

Other Autobots

Dinobots

The Dinobots are a faction of Autobots who have dinosaur alternate modes. The first three were created in "S.O.S. Dinobots" while the later two were created in "War of the Dinobots".

Aerialbots
The Aerialbots are a faction of Autobots who were created from Earth-style aircraft by Vector Sigma following Alpha Trion's sacrifice. They are the Autobots' first combiners faction.

Protectobots
The Protectobots are an Autobot faction and the second of their combiner faction who are charged with protecting the humans, rescuing them, and enforcing the law.

Female Autobots
There are some Female Autobots in the group.

Technobots
The Technobots are an Autobot faction and the third combiner group. They were created by Grimlock at the time he had an intelligence boost and they act like scientists.

Throttlebots
The Throttlebots are an Autobot faction who are known for their speed and agility.

Autobot Targetmasters
The Targetmasters are Transformers who can transform into Weapons. The ones on the Autobots' side were created by the Nebulans that they befriended.

Autobot Headmasters
The Headmasters are transformers who are partnered with Nebulons in special robot suits that enable them to transform into the head of the Autobot.

Clonebots
The Clonebots are the Autobot's version of the Clonecons.

Junkions
The Junkions are a race of scrap metal robots who come from the planet of the same name.

Decepticons
The Decepticons (known as Destrons or on occasion Deathtrons in Japan) are the enemies of the Autobots, and the villains in the fictional universe of the movie and cartoon Transformers toyline and related spin-off comics and cartoons. Their best known leader is Megatron.

Other terms for the Decepticons are Décepticans (in France), Destructors (in Italy), Bedragarna (in Sweden), Bedragoner (in Denmark), Shakranikim (in Israel) and Álca (in Hungary).

Main characters

Insecticons
The Insecticons are a race of Cybertronians who can turn into insects. They possess the ability to eat any matter to power themselves, create clones, sport weather-controlling abilities, and make use of cerebro-shells. They are often in a rocky alliance with the Decepticons.

Constructicons
The Constructicons are a race of Cybertronians who became construction vehicles and are the first combiners to appear in the show. They used to be friends with Omega Supreme before they were corrupted into serving Megatron.

Coneheads
The Coneheads are a Decepticon group who are mostly jet fighters.

Decepticon City

Stunticons
The Stunticons are a Decepticon faction and their second combiner group who was created by the Decepticons through Vector Sigma. The Decepticons stole five vehicles in order to create them.

Combaticons
The Combaticons are a Decepticon faction and the their third Combiner group. When Megatron banished Starscream to the island of Guadalcanal, he found old military vehicles from World War II and used stolen personality components which he placed into the vehicles in order to create the Combaticons.

Heralds of Unicron
Unicron used some Decepticons to create his heralds.

Multi Changers
The Multi Changers are Decepticons who have more than one alternative mode.

Predacons
The Predacons are a Decepticon faction and their fourth combiner group. They can turn into animals.

Battlechargers
The Battlechargers are a duo of Decepticon dragsters.

Terrorcons
The Terrorcons are a Decepticon faction and their fifth combiner group. They can turn into various monsters.

Decepticon Targetmasters
These Targemasters were created by the Nebulons on Lord Zarak's side.

Decepticon Headmasters
These Headmasters were created by the Decepticons on Lord Zarak's side. Most of them were made from the heads of the Decepticons that have animal forms.

Horrorcons
The Horrorcons are the triple-changers of the Decepticon Headmasters.

Clonecons
The Clonecons are the Decepticon's version of the Clonebots.

Humans

Nebulans 
Nebulans are humanoid aliens from the planet Nebulos who co-operate with the Transformers. Some Nebulans have allied with the Autobots, others with the Decepticons. The Nebulans' first and last appearance was in the three-part episode The Rebirth, which was intended as the pilot episode of the fourth season, but ended up being the season's only episode and the last episode in the entire series.

Nebulan Headmasters
The Nebulans who co-operate with the Headmasters transform into the Transformers' heads.

Nebulan Targetmasters
The Nebulans who co-operate with the Targetmasters transform into the Transformers' weapons.

Other characters

City-bots components
The following are components of Metroplex, Trypticon, Scorponok, and Fortress Maximus:

Mini-Cassettes
Cassette warriors (or "Mini-Cassettes", or simply "Cassettes"or “Mini-Cons” like in Transformers Robots in disguise) are tiny Transformers; they are no taller than the humans. Their alternate mode is that of a microcassette.

According to The Transformers' version, in the days of Megatron, Decepticons developed the art of espionage using cassette technology. Their first cassette, Laserbeak, could fly undetected into any Autobot stronghold, record information and then return to base. Then the Decepticons decided to increase their spying abilities with Ratbat. As a bat, Ratbat can hide in crevices that Laserbeak cannot reach, and is especially effective in tunnels, caves or in the darkness of space. Ratbat records from the Autobots' most carefully guarded secrets. The Autobots had no choice but to strike back with these Decepticon techniques of stealth, building their own force of cassette Transformers, with Blaster as their guardian. They constructed Ramhorn, the rhino, who can use animalistic force if cornered, and Steeljaw, the lion, who can crawl through the foliage of any alien world, to sneak up on Decepticons. They also bolstered their cassette force with Rewind and Eject, who can transform to robot mode and use more conventional fighting force techniques.

The alternate version of the Cassette warriors' origin is stated in the animated series. According to this version, they (or, at any rate, the beast-moded ones) were once created by the divine inventor Primacron.

Autobot Mini-Cassettes

Decepticon Mini-Cassettes

References 
  Text was copied from Transformers Wiki, which is released under a Creative Commons Attribution-Share Alike 3.0 (Unported) (CC-BY-SA 3.0) license.

Lists of characters in American television animation
TV series